Luna Parker was a French pop group in the 1980s.

History 
Rachel Ortas and Eric Tabuchi formed the pop duo after leaving the French new wave band Tokow Boys. Their single Tes états d'âme Éric was an enormous hit in France in 1986. They only released one album Félin pour l'autre in 1988. Their songs are lighthearted and cute and their lyrics use a lot of silly word play: for example, the title of their album can mean in English either "feline for another" or "made for each other."

Discography 
Singles
 1986 : Tes états d'âme Éric (#10 in France, Silver disc)
 1987 : Le challenge des espoirs
 1988 : Fric-Frac
 1988 : Tic-Taquatique
Albums
 1988 : Félin pour l'autre

References 

French pop music groups